The Darwin Falls Wilderness is a protected area in the northern Mojave Desert adjacent to Death Valley National Park. The  wilderness area was created by the California Desert Protection Act of 1994 and is managed by the Bureau of Land Management as part of the National Wilderness Preservation System.

The wilderness includes portions of the Darwin Plateau and the Darwin Hills. Much of the higher elevations are Tertiary volcanic rocks while the lower elevations to the southeast in Darwin Canyon are dominated by Permian marine sedimentary and metasedimentary rock. Though the wilderness is traditionally considered to be within the northern Mojave Desert, some classifications acknowledge floristic affinities with the colder deserts to the north and consider this the Southeastern Great Basin Ecoregion. A desert scrub community is common in the wilderness with Joshua tree woodlands at higher elevations.

Darwin Falls

Darwin Falls, for which the wilderness is named, is actually located outside the wilderness in adjacent Death Valley National Park. Darwin Falls is in a narrow, shaded gorge where perennial flow and pools allow for a riparian habitat uncommon in the Mojave Desert.

The falls are most easily accessed from the east through Death Valley National Park and not through the more remote and difficult terrain of the Darwin Falls Wilderness. 

Darwin Falls, the Darwin Falls Wilderness, and all other areas named "Darwin" in the vicinity are named after Darwin French (1822–1902), a local rancher, miner, and explorer.

Access
The nearest settlement is the community of Darwin. Access to this wilderness is via State Route 190 through Panamint Valley approximately 30 miles east of Olancha and along the road into Darwin or down the Darwin Canyon Road.

See also
 Darwin Falls
 Protected areas of the Mojave Desert
 North American desert flora

References

External links
 

Wilderness areas of California
Protected areas of Inyo County, California
Protected areas of the Mojave Desert
Bureau of Land Management areas in California